This article contains a list of named passenger trains in India.

A

B

C

D

E

F

G

Gangaur Express (Mumbai Central - Jaipur)

H

I

J

K

L

M

Malwa Express (Indore -Jammutawi) 
.
Mandore Express (Jodhpur - New Delhi)
.
Mewar Express (Udaipur - Hazrat Nizamuddin)

N
Nandigram Express (Mumbai-Nagpur)
Narmada Express (Bilaspur - Indore)

P

Penchvalley Express (Indore - Chhindwara)

R

S

Shaktipunj Express (Jabalpur - Howrah) Sarnath Express (Chhapra - Durg)

T

U

Ujjaini Express (Dehradun - Indore/Ujjain)

V

W

Y

References

India
 
Indian railway-related lists